Vashti Cunningham (born January 18, 1998) is an American track and field athlete specializing in the high jump. She is the daughter of retired National Football League (NFL) quarterback Randall Cunningham, niece of retired NFL fullback Sam Cunningham, and the younger sister of Randall Cunningham II. Her mother is Felicity de Jager Cunningham a former ballerina with the Dance Theatre of Harlem. Vashti, like her brother two years ahead of her in school, jumped for Bishop Gorman High School in Las Vegas, Nevada until March 2016 when she signed with Nike. She announced at that time she intended to continue her education at a university while competing as a professional athlete.

Jumping career
On April 18, 2015, at the Mt. SAC Relays in Walnut, California, Cunningham jumped , to set the new national high school record. At age 17, that was also equal to the No. 4 world Youth mark (under 19 years old). At that date it was the No. 3 mark in the world in 2015. She was named USATF Athlete of the Week for that performance. On June 27, 2015 she won the U.S. Junior National Championship. A month later at the 2015 Pan American Junior Athletics Championships, she improved again, jumping . That mark equaled the World Youth Best.

On March 12, 2016, Vashti jumped  while winning the 2016 USA Indoor Track and Field Championships in Portland, Oregon. The mark established a new World Junior Record. At the time, just one week before the 2016 IAAF World Indoor Championships, which were held in the same facility in the Portland convention center, Cunningham's jump was the No. 1 jump in the world in 2016. Eight days later, she won the World Indoor Championship.

In March 2017, Cunningham jumped  to win at 2017 USA Indoor Track and Field Championships. On April 15, 2017, Cunningham jumped  to win in Torrance, California at Mt. SAC Relays, two weeks later she jumped  to win at Penn Relays. Cunningham jumped  to place 3rd behind World Champion Mariya Lasitskene on May 27 in Eugene at IAAF Diamond League 2017 Prefontaine Classic. On June 23, Cunningham jumped  to win in 2017 USA Outdoor Track and Field Championships at Sacramento State University. On July 9, 2017, Cunningham jumped  to place 2nd at London Müller Anniversary Games. On July 21, 2017, Cunningham jumped  to place 3rd at IAAF Diamond League 2017 Herculis in Fontvieille, Monaco. On August 12, 2017, Cunningham jumped  to place 10th at World Championships.

On February 18, 2018, Cunningham jumped  to win third consecutive high jump indoor title and 4th US senior title at 2018 USA Indoor Track and Field Championships in Albuquerque, New Mexico. On March 1, Cunningham jumped  to place second behind World Champion Mariya Lasitskene in high jump at 2018 IAAF World Indoor Championships in Birmingham, United Kingdom.

Competition record

Pan American junior championships record and world youth record

USA national championships and Olympic trials

American junior record
American junior outdoor record

References

External links

Olympic hopeful high jumper sets sights on Rio from National Public Radio
USA Indoor Track and Field Championships

Living people
1998 births
Sportspeople from Las Vegas
American female high jumpers
Bishop Gorman High School alumni
Athletes (track and field) at the 2016 Summer Olympics
Olympic track and field athletes of the United States
World Athletics Championships athletes for the United States
World Athletics Championships medalists
Track and field athletes from Nevada
USA Indoor Track and Field Championships winners
USA Outdoor Track and Field Championships winners
World Athletics Indoor Championships winners
Athletes (track and field) at the 2020 Summer Olympics
21st-century American women
20th-century American women